The Girl from Florida Street is a 1922 Argentine silent film directed and written by José A. Ferreyra.

Cast
Leonor Alvear as Elsa, una empleada
Álvaro Escobar as  Pedro, el botones
Augusto Gocalbes as  Don Jaime, el dueño
Elena Guido as  Juana, la dactilógrafa
Jorge Lafuente as  Jorge, estudiante de derecho
Carlos Lasalle as  Carlos, un muchacho
Lidia Liss as Alcira
César Robles as Amancio, el gerente

External links
 

1922 films
1920s Spanish-language films
Argentine black-and-white films
Films directed by José A. Ferreyra
Argentine silent films